FitzJohn was a bus manufacturer in Muskegon, Michigan, United States.

FitzJohn, Fitzjohn, Fitz-John, or Fitz John may also refer to:

Modern surname
 Gavin Fitzjohn, member of Welsh band Adequate Seven
 Tony Fitzjohn (born 1945), British conservationist in Africa
 Val Fitzjohn (1878–1934), Scottish professional golfer
 William Henry Fitzjohn (1915–1989), Sierra Leonean churchman, educator and diplomat

Medieval patronymic
 Children of John fitzRichard, one of William the Conqueror's supporters; including:
 Pain fitzJohn (died 1137)
 Eustace fitz John (died 1157)
 Roger FitzJohn (died 1248/1249), Lord of Clavering, Warkworth and Horsford; son of John FitzRobert and Ada de Baillol
 Children of John Fitzgeoffrey (1205?–1258) Lord of Shere and Justiciar of Ireland; including:
 John FitzJohn of Shere (died 1275)
 Richard FitzJohn of Shere (died 1297)
 Maud FitzJohn, Countess of Warwick (died 1301)
 William FitzJohn (died 1326) Archbishop of Cashel and Lord Chancellor of Ireland. 
 Thomas FitzJohn (died 1328), 2nd Earl of Kildare, Lord Offaly
 The 1st, 7th, and 9th Knight of Kerry
 John Fitz-John,  Archdeacon of Totnes
 Walter Blake fitz John (died 1508), Bishop of Clonmacnoise, Ireland 
 Dominick Lynch fitz John, Mayor (1548–9) of Galway, Ireland 

Given name
 Fitz John Porter (1822–1901) United States Army officer and a Union general during the American Civil War 
 Fitz-John Winthrop (1637–1707), governor of the Colony of Connecticut

See also

 Fitzjohn's Primary School, community primary school in Hampstead, London, UK.